Far Away in Time was a 1987 CD compilation of tracks by Martha and the Muffins.  The compilation consisted of Metro Music (the band's first album) in its entirety (tracks 1-10), plus four tracks from Trance and Dance (tracks 12-15), two tracks from This is the Ice Age (tracks 16-17), and the non-album single "Insect Love"  (track 11).

The album was compiled without any input from the band, and the poorly researched liner notes by Mick Wall (on the 1993 re-issue) contain numerous errors about the history of the band's various line-ups, as well as several errors about the origins of the tracks on this compilation.  The correct information is listed above.

Track listing

References 

Martha and the Muffins albums
1987 compilation albums
Albums produced by Mike Howlett
Virgin Records compilation albums